Vietnamese National Football Super Cup, also called the Thaco National Football Super Cup due to sponsorship reasons, is Vietnamese football's annual match contested between the champions of the previous V.League 1 season and the holders of the Vietnamese Cup. If the V.League 1 champions also won the Vietnamese Cup, then the league runners-up provide the opposition.

The current holders are V.League 1 winners Hanoi FC, who defeated runner-ups Hải Phòng 2–0 in the 2022 match.

Results

Toyota Cup 1998/1999

Toyota Cup 2000

Honda Cup 2001

Toyota Cup 2002

VTC Cup 2003

2004 IZZI Cup

2005 IZZI Cup

2006 IZZI Cup

2007 IZZI Cup

2008 IZZI Cup

2009 Megastar Cup

2010 584 Group Cup

2011 PV Gas Cup

2012 PV Gas Cup

2013 Cúp VPP Hồng Hà

2014 Thaco Cup

2015 Thaco Cup

2016 Thaco Cup

2017 Thaco Cup

2018 Thaco Cup

2019 Thaco Cup

2020 Thaco Cup

2022 Thaco Cup

Winners

By year 
1998/1999 – Thể Công
2000 – Sông Lam Nghệ An
2001 – Sông Lam Nghệ An
2002 – Sông Lam Nghệ An
2003 – Hoàng Anh Gia Lai
2004 – Hoàng Anh Gia Lai
2005 – Vicem Hải Phòng
2006 – Gạch Đồng Tâm Long An
2007 – Becamex Bình Dương
2008 – Becamex Bình Dương
2009 – Lam Sơn Thanh Hóa
2010 – Hà Nội T&T
2011 – Sông Lam Nghệ An
2012 – SHB Đà Nẵng
2013 – Vissai Ninh Bình
2014 – Becamex Bình Dương
2015 – Becamex Bình Dương
2016 – Than Quảng Ninh
2017 – Quảng Nam
2018 – Hà Nội
2019 – Hà Nội
2020 – Hà Nội
2022 – Hà Nội

By number of wins

See also 
 Football in Vietnam

References

External links
Vietnam – List of Cup Winners, RSSSF.com

 
Super
Vietnam